Zirconium (IV) hydroxide,  often called hydrous zirconia is an ill-defined material or family of materials variously described as  and .  All are white solids with low solubility in water.  These materials are widely employed in the preparation of solid acid catalysts.

These materials are generated by mild base hydrolysis of zirconium halides and nitrates.  A typical precursor is zirconium oxychloride.

References

External links 
 

Hydroxides
Zirconium(IV) compounds